Heart Trouble is a 1928 American silent comedy film starring Harry Langdon and Doris Dawson.  It is Langdon's final silent film and his last feature-length one. First National Pictures was preparing to fire Langdon. Reportedly less than a hundred prints were made and it went into only limited release, even though the reviews were good. It is presumed to be lost.

Plot
A young man tries to enlist in the United States Army for World War I, but is rejected as physically unfit.

Cast
 Harry Langdon as Harry Van Housen
 Doris Dawson as The Girl
 Lionel Belmore as Adolph Van Housen
 Madge Hunt as Mrs. Adolph van Housen
 Bud Jamison as Contractor
 Mark Hamilton as Conductor
 Nelson McDowell as Conductor
 Edythe Chapman
 Clark Comstock
 Jack Pratt as Army Captain
 Bob Reeves
 Kid Wagner

References

External links

American black-and-white films
Silent American comedy films
American silent feature films
Lost American films
American World War I films
1928 comedy films
1928 films
1928 lost films
Lost comedy films
1920s American films